Kayılar is a quarter of the town Yaylakent, Orta District, Çankırı Province, Turkey. Its population is 386 (2021).

References

Populated places in Orta District